Titanium yellow, also nickel antimony titanium yellow, nickel antimony titanium yellow rutile, CI Pigment Yellow 53, or C.I. 77788, is a yellow pigment with the chemical composition of NiO·Sb2O3·20TiO2. It is a complex inorganic compound. Its melting point lies above 1000 °C, and has extremely low solubility in water. While it contains antimony and nickel, their bioavailability is very low, so the pigment is relatively safe. 

The pigment has crystal lattice of rutile, with 2–5% of titanium ions replaced with nickel(II) and 9–12% of them replaced with antimony(III).

Titanium yellow is manufactured by reacting fine powders of metal oxides, hydroxides, or carbonates in solid state in temperatures between 1000 and 1200 °C, either in batches or continuously in a pass-through furnace.

Titanium yellow is used primarily as a pigment for plastics and ceramic glazes, and in art painting.

See also
 List of colors
 List of inorganic pigments

External links
 Database of Painting Pigments
 chemicalbook.com

Inorganic pigments
Nickel compounds
Antimony(III) compounds
Titanium(IV) compounds
Shades of yellow